William George Lloyd (23 July 1896 – 29 August 1950) was an Australian rules footballer who played with St Kilda in the Victorian Football League (VFL).

Notes

External links 

1896 births
1950 deaths
Australian rules footballers from Melbourne
St Kilda Football Club players
People from Prahran, Victoria